Irene Sánchez-Escribano Figueroa (born 25 August 1992 in Toledo) is a Spanish runner competing primarily in the 3000 metres steeplechase. She represented her country at the 2017 World Championships without reaching the final.

In 2019, she competed in the senior women's race at the 2019 IAAF World Cross Country Championships held in Aarhus, Denmark. She finished in 25th place.

Personal bests
Outdoor
800 metres – 2:11.06 (Castellón 2012)
1500 metres – 4:24.66 (Mataró 2012)
3000 metres – 9:19.88 (Pamplona 2017)
10 kilometres – 34:04 (Madrid 2016)
2000 metres steeplechase – 6:51.20 (Madrid 2015)
3000 metres steeplechase – 9:27.53 (Birmingham 2019)

Indoor
1500 metres – 4:24.63 (Madrid 2017)
3000 metres – 9:13.82 (Valencia 2017)

International competitions

References

1992 births
Living people
Spanish female middle-distance runners
Spanish female steeplechase runners
World Athletics Championships athletes for Spain
Sportspeople from Toledo, Spain
Spanish Athletics Championships winners
Athletes (track and field) at the 2018 Mediterranean Games
Mediterranean Games competitors for Spain
20th-century Spanish women
21st-century Spanish women